Trochochlamys ogasawarana is a species of minute air-breathing land snail, a terrestrial pulmonate gastropod mollusk in the family Chronidae. 

The survival of this land snail species is critically endangered.

NOTE: The combination Trochochlamys ogasawarana, from the source below, cannot be traced with certainty to any known snail species, but it may be the species described by Pilsbry (1902) as Kaliella ogasawarana.

Distribution
This species is endemic to Japan.

References

External links
 Pilsbry, H. A. (1902). New land Mollusca from Japan and the Bonin Islands. Proceedings of the Academy of Natural Sciences of Philadelphia. 54: 25-32

Molluscs of Japan
Trochochlamys
Taxonomy articles created by Polbot